Azurest South is the home and workplace of Amaza Lee Meredith, one of the nation's first black female architects. Located on the campus of Virginia State University, the home is one of the few examples of the Post World War I German style: International Style in Virginia. She shared the home with her partner, Dr. Edna Meade Colson, who served as dean of the Virginia State University School of Education. Meredith founded Virginia State University's fine arts department in 1930. When Meredith died, she left half of the property's interest to the Virginia State University National Alumni Association, and after Colson's death, the association purchased the other half of the estate.

It was listed on the National Register of Historic Places in 1993.

Azurest South displays "a fascination with modernity, a familiarity with new materials and construction details, and a love of nature." The building is located in a dell on the eastern edge of campus.

References

Virginia African Heritage Program

External links

Azurest South registration form for the National Register of Historic Places (listed in the National Archives)  
National Park Service Article on Azurest South (scroll down to see article)
Virginia State Alumni Association article on Azurest South
Cinnamon Traveler article (feat. many views of Azurest South)

Houses on the National Register of Historic Places in Virginia
International style architecture in Virginia
Houses completed in 1938
Houses in Chesterfield County, Virginia
National Register of Historic Places in Chesterfield County, Virginia
Virginia State University